Burke Reid is an Australian–Canadian record producer/musician.

Career 
After migrating from Canada to Australia in 1994 at the age of 14 years, Reid became one third of the band Gerling in 1997. Following the announcement of a hiatus by Gerling in 2007, Reid continued in the music industry as a record producer.

The first album that Reid produced was The Mess Hall's Devils Elbow which won the Australian Music Prize (AMP) in 2007. He was subsequently involved with numerous AMP-nominated albums, such as The Drones' Havilah, Dan Kelly Dan Kelly's Dream, Jack Ladder Love is Gone and Courtney Barnett Sometimes I Sit and Think, and Sometimes I Just Sit.

Discography
Producer, engineer and/or mixer for the following artists:
 Bad Dreems – Doomsday Ballet (2019)
 The Bungalows – Monkey Mountain Road (2011)  
 Canyons – Keep Your Dreams (2011) 
 The Chemist – Ballet In The Badlands (2013)
 City Calm Down – Television (2019)
 Courtney Barnett – Sometimes I Sit and Think, and Sometimes I Just Sit (2015)
 Courtney Barnett – Tell Me How You Really Feel (2018) 
 Curse of Company – Leo Magnets Joins A Gang (2009) 
 Dan Kelly –  Dan Kelly's Dream (2010) 
 Donny Benet –  The Don (2018)
 Donny Benet –  Mr. Experience (2020)
 The Drones – Havilah (2008) 
 The Drones – I See Seaweed (2013) 
 DZ Deathrays – Black Rat (2014)
 DZ Deathrays – Blood On My Leather (2016)
 DZ Deathrays – Bloody Lovely (2018)
 Eskimo Joe – Wastelands (2013) 
 Flyte – Please Eloise (2015) 
 Flyte – The Loved Ones (2017)
 Flyte – White Roses (2019)
 Gareth Liddiard – Strange Tourist (2011) 
 Ghoul – Dunks (2011) 
 Ghosts Of Television – Furthest Village From The Sun (2008) 
 Green Buzzard – Eazy, Queezy, Squeezy (2016) 
 Green Buzzard – Space Man Rodeo (2017)
 Holly Throsby – Team (2011) 
 Jack Ladder – Love Is Gone (2009) 
 Jack Ladder and The Dreamlanders – Hurtsville (2011) 
 Julia Jacklin – Crushing (2019)
 July Talk – Pray for It (2020)
 The Kill Devil Hills – Man You Should Explode (2009) 
 Liam Finn – FOMO (2011) 
 Loene Carmen – It Walks Like Love (2009)
 The Mess Hall – Devils Elbow (2007)
 The Mess Hall – For the Birds (2009)
 Mike Noga – The Balladeer Hunter (2011)
 Mossy – Waterfall (2016)
 Olympia – Self Talk (2016)
 Olympia – Flamingo (2019)
 Oh Mercy – Deep Heat (2012)
 Papa VS Pretty – Self titled EP (2007)
 Peter Garrett – A Version of Now (2016)
 PVT – Church With No Magic (2010)
 The Preatures – Girlhood (2017)
 Rolling Blackouts Coastal Fever – Sideways To New Italy (2020)
 Ryan Downey –  A Ton of Colours (2021)
 Seekae – +DOME (2011)
 Sarah Blasko – Eternal Return (2015)
 Sports Team – Deep Down Happy (2020)
 Tucker B's – Nightmares in the Key of (((((WOW))))) (2009)
 Twin Beasts – Bad Love (2014)
 Warhorse – Guns (2007)
 Willis Drummond – A Ala B (2012)
 Willis Drummond – Tabula rasa (2016)
 Wolf & Cub – Heavy Weight (2013)
 Wolf & Cub – One To The Other (2010)
 Wolf & Cub – See The Light & All Through The Night (2012)
 Young Empires – White Doves & We Don't Sleep Tonight (2012)

Musician and co-producer for the following albums as a member of Gerling:
 Gerling – 4
 Gerling – Bad Blood!!!
 Gerling – When Young Terrorists Chase the Sun
 Gerling – Children of Telepathic Experiences

References

External links
www.burkereid.com 

Living people
Year of birth missing (living people)
Canadian emigrants to Australia
Musicians from Sydney
Australian record producers
Australian musicians
Gerling members